Guddi may refer to:

Guddi (1961 film), a Punjabi film
Guddi (1971 film), a Hindi film 
Guddi, a 2022 Bengali TV series
Guddi Devi, Indian politician 
Guddi Maruti, an Indian film and television actress